Golden Highway (also known as Mitchells Line of Road at its eastern end) is a  highway, located in the Hunter and Orana regions of New South Wales, Australia. It runs eastwards from Dubbo towards Newcastle on the coast, allowing road transport to avoid travelling over the Blue Mountains to Sydney, and is designated route B84.

Route

Golden Highway commences at the intersection with Newell Highway in Dubbo and heads in an easterly direction as a four-lane, single-carriageway road, narrowing to two lanes through Dubbo's eastern suburbs, and continues through Dunedoo where it is concurrent with Castlereagh Highway for approximately  then through Merriwa, Sandy Hollow, Denman, Jerrys Plains and Mount Thorley, where it eventually terminates at the intersection with New England Highway at Belford, south of Singleton. The highway then turns east onto Mitchells Line of Road while Putty Road continues to Singleton.

Golden Highway provides a fairly low altitude crossing of the Great Dividing Range. It runs through the Hunter Region and gives access to the golden west of New South Wales.

History
The passing of the Main Roads Act of 1924 through the Parliament of New South Wales provided for the declaration of Main Roads, roads partially funded by the State government through the Main Roads Board (later the Department of Main Roads, and eventually Transport for NSW). Main Road No. 62 was declared from the intersection with Great Northern Highway (today New England Highway) at Scone, via Merriwa and Cassilis to the intersection with Craboon-Mullaley Road at Coolah, Main Road No. 206 was declared from the intersection of North-Western Highway (today Mitchell Highway) in Dubbo, via Ballimore to Dunedoo, Main Road No. 209 was declared from Muswellbrook, via Denman to Merriwa, and Main Road No. 213 was declared from Mount Thorley, via Jerrys Plains to Denman, on the same day, 8 August 1928. With the passing of the Main Roads (Amendment) Act of 1929 to provide for additional declarations of State Highways and Trunk Roads, this was amended to Trunk Road 62 and Main Roads 206 and 209 and 213 on 8 April 1929.

The Department of Main Roads, which had succeeded the New South Wales MRB in 1932, re-routed the western end of Trunk Road 62 from Coolah to terminate at the intersection of Trunk Road 55 (later Castlereagh Highway) in Craboon (8km east of Dunedoo) on 29 June 1977; the former alignment between Cassilis and Coolah was re-declared as Main Road 618.

The passing of the Roads Act of 1993 through the Parliament of New South Wales updated road classifications and the way they could be declared within New South Wales. Under this act, Golden Highway was declared as State Highway 27 on 22 November 1996, from the intersection with New England Highway at Minimbah east of Whittingham via Mount Thorley, Jerrys Plains, Denman, Merriwa, Cassilis and Dunedoo to the intersection with Newell Highway in Dubbo, subsuming Main Roads 206 and 213; The highway today, as Highway 27, still retains this declaration.

State Route 84 was signed across Main Road 206, Trunk Road 62, and Main Road 213 - from Dubbo via Dunedoo, Cassilis, Merriwa and Denman to Muswellbrook - in 1974; when Golden Highway was declared in 1996, the eastern end of State Route 84 was altered to follow it and terminate at Belford. With the conversion to the newer alphanumeric system in 2013, this was replaced with route B84.

Major junctions

See also

 Highways in Australia
 List of highways in New South Wales

References

Highways in New South Wales
Roads in the Hunter Region
Hunter River (New South Wales)